Stypandra glauca, commonly known as the nodding blue lily, is a flowering plant in the family Asphodelaceae. It is a rhizomatous perennial plant with blue lily-like flowers with yellow stamens. It is widespread across southern areas of Australia.

Description
The leaves are stiff, pale green to bluish, narrowly lance-shaped, stem-clasping in an alternate, opposite arrangement, and are up to 200 millimetres long.

Taxonomy and naming
Stypandra glauca was first formally described in 1810 by Robert Brown and the description was published in Prodromus florae Novae Hollandiae. The specific epithet (glauca) means "sea green" in reference to the foliage.

Distribution and habitat
Nodding blue lily is a widespread species growing on a variety of soils including sand, granite, shale, limestone and clay  sometimes in woodland or mostly in dry forest.

Ingestion of flowering plants has been found to cause blindness in goats.

Gallery

See also

 List of plants known as lily

References

External links
 The Australasian Virtual Herbarium (AVH) – Occurrence data for Stypandra glauca
 
 

Asparagales of Australia
Angiosperms of Western Australia
Flora of South Australia
Flora of Queensland
Flora of New South Wales
Flora of the Australian Capital Territory
Flora of Victoria (Australia)
Garden plants
Plants described in 1810
Taxa named by Robert Brown (botanist, born 1773)
glauca